Garlasco is a comune in the Province of Pavia in the Italian region Lombardy.

Garlasco may also refer to:

 Marc Garlasco, a senior military expert for Human Rights Watch
 Garlasco pig, an Italian pig breed